Pedro Nahuel Fernández (born 5 April 1987) is an Argentine professional footballer who plays as a goalkeeper for Alvorado.

Career
Fernández made his professional debut in June 2009 with Chacarita Juniors in Primera B Nacional, he played the full ninety minutes in a draw with San Martín (SJ). One more appearance followed in 2008–09, prior to none in 2009–10 and 2010–11 but two came in 2011–12 as Chacarita were relegated to Primera B Metropolitana. In the third tier, Fernández made eight appearances. In June 2013, Fernández completed a loan move to fellow Primera B Metropolitana team Villa Dálmine. Nineteen appearances followed in 2013–14 and 2014, the latter ended in promotion to Primera B Nacional; where Chacarita were also promoted.

He spent one more season with Villa Dálmine, 2015, which included eight appearances, he then returned to Chacarita ahead of 2016 campaign. In 2016–17, Fernández played nineteen times as the club won promotion to the Primera División. He subsequently made his top-flight debut on 10 September 2017 against Tigre. Fernández's 100th career appearance came on 4 March 2018 during a draw away to River Plate. Fernández terminated his contract with the club in January 2019, eight months after they returned to Primera B Nacional, prior to joining an San Martín of the Primera División.

In July 2020, Fernández joined Alvorado.

Career statistics
.

References

External links

1987 births
Living people
Sportspeople from Buenos Aires Province
Argentine footballers
Association football goalkeepers
Primera Nacional players
Argentine Primera División players
Primera B Metropolitana players
Chacarita Juniors footballers
Villa Dálmine footballers
San Martín de Tucumán footballers
Club Atlético Alvarado players